David Lattin (born December 23, 1943) is an American former basketball player. He was the starting center for the Texas Western Miners in their NCAA championship year in 1966. During his playing career, he was listed at 6 feet 6 inches tall and 225 lbs. His nickname during his career was "Big Daddy D".

David Lattin was born on December 23, 1943 in Houston Texas. His mother, Elsie Lattin, was widowed when Lattin’s father died in 1949. Lattin attended elementary and secondary schools in Houston before graduating from Evan E. Worthing Senior High School in 1963. Lattin was named All-State and All-American in basketball both his junior and senior years and was the first Texas player to be named to a High School All-American team.

Lattin left Tennessee State in 1964 citing the lack of basketball competition. He returned to Houston and played the AAAU before receiving a full scholarship to attend Texas Western College in 1965 where he played with the Miners, a Division 1 team in the NCAA. Under the leadership of Coach Don Haskins, the Miners won the 1966 Division 1 NCAA National Championship with five black starting players. Lattin was named All-American during the 1966 and 1967 seasons.

In 1967, Lattin left Texas Western College after he was drafted as the number ten pick by the NBA’s San Francisco Warriors.
The Kansas City Chiefs, of the American Football League, used their final pick in the 1967 draft (443rd overall) on Lattin as a prospective wide receiver. He went on to play with the Phoenix Suns, the Pittsburgh Condors, and the Memphis Tams, ending his professional career with the Harlem Globe Trotters from 1973 to 1976. Returning to school, Lattin earned his B.S. degree in business administration and started several successful business ventures including Your Maison Housing.

Lattin was inducted into the Texas Black Sports Hall of Fame and the Naismith Memorial Basketball Hall of Fame in 2007. That year, he also wrote Slam Dunk to Glory.

Lattin has a son Clifton, a daughter Leslie, and several grandchildren.

His Grandson, Khadeem attended the University of Oklahoma. He had started every game of the 2016–2017 basketball season for the Sooners. Another grandson, Mathias Lattin is an accomplished blues musician and his band is the winner of the 2023 International Blues Challenge. 

He was portrayed by Schin A.S. Kerr in the 2006 Disney film Glory Road produced by Jerry Bruckheimer.

NBA career statistics

Regular season

Playoffs

College

External links
NBA and ABA career stats
Basketball Hall of Fame 2007 - Texas one of the best teams
History Makers

1943 births
Living people
21st-century African-American people
African-American basketball players
All-American college men's basketball players
American men's basketball players
Basketball players from Houston
Centers (basketball)
Harlem Globetrotters players
Memphis Tams players
Phoenix Suns expansion draft picks
Phoenix Suns players
Pittsburgh Condors players
San Francisco Warriors draft picks
San Francisco Warriors players
UTEP Miners men's basketball players
20th-century African-American sportspeople